The 2000 Rally Argentina (formally the 20th Rally Argentina) was the sixth round of the 2000 World Rally Championship. The race was held over four days between 11 May and 14 May 2000, and was won by Subaru's Richard Burns, his 8th win in the World Rally Championship.

Background

Entry list

Itinerary
All dates and times are ART (UTC−3).

Results

Overall

World Rally Cars

Classification

Special stages

Championship standings

FIA Cup for Production Rally Drivers

Classification

Special stages

Championship standings

References

External links
 Official website of the World Rally Championship

Rally Argentina
2000 World Rally Championship season